Saint Catherine of Alexandria is a tempera on panel painting, created c. 1512 by Luca Signorelli. It is a fragment from the predella of a lost altarpiece. It is now in the Museo Horne in Florence.

Sources
http://www.polomuseale.firenze.it/catalogo/scheda.asp?nctn=00287594&value=1

Paintings by Luca Signorelli
Paintings in the collection of the Museo Horne
1510s paintings
Signorelli
Books in art